The 2013 Korea Open Superseries Premier was the first super series tournament of the 2013 BWF Super Series. The tournament was held in Seoul, South Korea from January 8–13, 2013 and had a total purse of $1,000,000. A qualification was held to fill four places in all five disciplines of the main draws.

Men's singles

Seeds

  Lee Chong Wei (champion)
  Chen Long (first round)
  Chen Jin (first round)
  Du Pengyu (silver Medalist)
  Kenichi Tago (first round)
  Nguyen Tien Minh (first round)
  Hu Yun (quarterfinals)
  Sho Sasaki (withdrew)

Top half

Bottom half

Finals

Women's singles

Seeds

  Li Xuerui (first round)
  Wang Yihan (first round)
  Saina Nehwal (quarter-final)
  Juliane Schenk (second round)
  Wang Shixian (finals)
  Ratchanok Inthanon (first round)
  Jiang Yanjiao (second round)
  Tine Baun (second round)

Top half

Bottom half

Finals

Men's doubles

Seeds

  Mathias Boe / Carsten Mogensen
  Koo Kien Keat / Tan Boon Heong
  Cai Yun / Fu Haifeng
  Hiroyuki Endo / Kenichi Hayakawa
  Kim Ki-jung / Kim Sa-rang
  Ko Sung-hyun / Lee Yong-dae
  Hong Wei / Shen Ye
  Hirokatsu Hashimoto / Noriyasu Hirata

Top half

Bottom half

Finals

Women's doubles

Seeds

  Wang Xiaoli / Yu Yang
  Christinna Pedersen / Kamilla Rytter Juhl
  Misaki Matsutomo / Ayaka Takahashi
  Jung Kyung-eun / Kim Ha-na
  Bao Yixin / Tian Qing
  Cheng Shu / Zhao Yunlei
  Ma Jin / Tang Jinhua
  Duanganong Aroonkesorn / Kunchala Voravichitchaikul

Top half

Bottom half

Finals

Mixed doubles

Seeds

  Xu Chen / Ma Jin
  Tantowi Ahmad / Lilyana Natsir
  Chan Peng Soon / Goh Liu Ying
  Zhang Nan / Zhao Yunlei
  Sudket Prapakamol / Saralee Thoungthongkam
  Joachim Fischer Nielsen / Christinna Pedersen
  Muhammad Rijal / Debby Susanto
  Robert Mateusiak / Nadiezda Zieba

Top half

Bottom half

Finals

References

Korea Open (badminton)
Korea Open
Korea Open
Sport in Seoul
January 2013 sports events in South Korea